Amendment 42 was a ballot initiative, adopted by Colorado voters in November 2006, that amended Article XVIII of the Colorado Constitution to impose a minimum wage of $6.85 per hour, to be adjusted annually for inflation after 2007. The amendment was approved by 53.3% of voters.

The minimum wage in Colorado at the time of the election was $5.15 per hour.

See also
 List of Colorado ballot measures

References 

2006 Colorado ballot measures
Initiatives in the United States
Constitution of Colorado